The rivière Ferrée flows in the administrative region of Bas-Saint-Laurent, in the province of Quebec, in Canada, in the regional county municipalities of:
 MRC of Rimouski-Neigette Regional County Municipality: Rimouski Wildlife Reserve;
 MRC of La Mitis Regional County Municipality: unorganized territory Lac-des-Eaux-Mortes (Rimouski county).

The Ferrée river is a tributary of the southwest shore of the Lac des Eaux Mortes which is crossed by the Mistigougèche River; the latter flows to the southwest shore of the Mitis River, which flows northwest to the southeast coast of the St. Lawrence River where it flows at height of Sainte-Flavie and Grand-Métis.

Geography 

The Ferrée river rises at Lac Ferré, in the form of a hook, located in the northern part of the Rimouski Wildlife Reserve.

  south-east, up to the outlet of "Lac du Faisan" (coming from the south);
  eastward, to the outlet of Lac David (coming from the south);
  northeasterly, to the limit of the regional county municipality of La Mitis Regional County Municipality;
  north-east, to the bridge of a forest road;
  northeasterly, to its confluence.

The Ferrée river flows on the western shore of the Lac des Eaux Mortes, on the north side of the Baie de la Ferrée and opposite the confluence of the Source stream.

Toponymy 

The river Ferrée toponym was formalized on December 5, 1968 at the Commission de toponymie du Québec.

References

Appendices

See also 

La Mitis Regional County Municipality
Rimouski Wildlife Reserve
Lac-des-Eaux-Mortes, an unorganized territory
St. Lawrence River
Mitis River, a stream
Mistigougèche River, a stream
Lac des Eaux Mortes, a body of water

Rivers of Bas-Saint-Laurent